The Riverside Nature Center is a non-profit arboretum with wildlife and native plant sanctuary located on the Guadalupe River at 150 Francisco Lemos Street, Kerrville, Texas. The gardens are open daily without charge.

The center was first envisioned in 1987 by Susan Sander, with the Riverside Nature Center Association (RNCA) organized in 1989. Today's site was purchased in 1992. With extensive clearing and planting, it has become an arboretum with over 140 tree species, approximately 200 species of wildflowers, cacti, shrubs, and native grasses. It also contains a butterfly plant garden, sensory garden with Braille signs, and natural area with river trail.

See also 
 List of botanical gardens in the United States

External links 
 Riverside Nature Center

Botanical gardens in Texas
Protected areas of Kerr County, Texas
Guadalupe River (Texas)
Nature centers in Texas
Arboreta in Texas
Education in Kerr County, Texas
Braille trail sites